The Raaberbahn or GYSEV is a Hungarian-Austrian railway company based in Sopron, Hungary. The company is a joint enterprise of the states of Hungary (65.6%), Austria (28.2%), and a holding belonging to ÖBB (4.9%).

History 
The operation of the company was requested in 1872 by Baron Viktor Erlanger. It is sanctioned by law.

The constituent general meeting of the company was held on 1 February 1875 in Budapest, which Baron Viktor Erlanger did not attend. On his behalf, his brother Ludwig Erlanger, who was the manager of Erlanger Bank in Vienna, attended this meeting. He opened the founding general meeting by "transferring the rights granted to him (and not to Viktor) by the letter of authorizations to the limited liability company to be formed." Therefore, we can state that "the youngest Erlanger boy, Viktor, has nothing to do with the issue of the license of GYSEV."

The first line between the Hungarian cities Győr and Sopron was opened on 2 January 1876. The section between Sopron and Ebenfurth was opened for traffic on 28 October 1879. The adjoining Fertővidék Local Railway in Hungary started its operation on 19 December 1897.

The shareholding structure of the company did not change after the dissolution of the Austro-Hungarian Monarchy. The company currently belongs in 65.6% to the Hungarian State, 28.2% in the Austrian State and in 4.9% to ÖBB. Today's ownership structure was established in 2009.

At the end of World War I, a special railway company was an independent railway, independent from MÁV, whose operation and independence in two countries was preserved by the Trianon Peace Treaty.

On 30 June 1942, the most serious accident in the history of GYSEV occurred on the Fertővidék Local Railway. The BCmot from Celldömölk to Sopron from a 16-lane motor car and two of its sidecars crashed into the open-air mixed train in front of the entrance marker at Vönöck station. The accident occurred due to the lack of braking of the train because the wagons were not connected to the main overhead line in Celldömölk. The tragedy had 80 injured and four dead.

On the morning of 15 November 1973, a serious accident also occurred, when the Cyclamen Express Train from Sopron via Győr to Budapest departed  according to the schedule. At the same time, a freight train with a damaged break system was waiting at Fertőboz train station. The driver of the express train to Budapest was right to believe that the track was free due to a poorly managed, so-called spacing signal. Then, right before Fertőboz, he noticed the freight train on his track, however it was too late, and the collision could not be avoided. Twenty-three were injured in the accident, six of them severely.

On 26 May 1979, the Fertőszentmiklós-Celldömölk line was terminated on the Fertővidék Local Railway. Of the fifty kilometers of today's local railway, 13 kilometers are in Hungary and the rest in Austria.

The electrification of the Győr-Sopron railway was completed in 1987, and on 15 May 1987, seven locomotives V43 320-326 arrived in exchange for the prior M41 diesel locomotives.

Today, GYSEV operates six major railway lines in two countries and, with its European Economic Area license, carries rail passengers in both countries, as well as rail freight across Europe. An ancillary line of one of the former joining lines, the Fertővidék Local Railway (Fhév) was established in 1880 as a local railway according to the rules of the 1880s, but it is operated by GYSEV.

The extension of the railway lines began with the takeover of the Sopron-Szombathely railway line from MÁV in 2001. The electrification of the degraded track and the speeding up of investments started in 2002. The area of the railway company was further extended in December 2006 by the Szombathely-Szentgotthárd railway line, which was renovated and electrified from September 2009 until 2011.

Based on the decision of the Ministry of National Development, GYSEV took over the operation of the public passenger transport from 1 October 2011, and from 11 December 2011 to Rajka-Hegyeshalom-Csorna-Répcelak-Porpác, Porpác-Szombathely, Szombathely-Kőszeg, Szombathely-Zalaszentiván, as well as the currently defunct Körmend-Zalalövő railway line, thus extending its operating area by another 214 km railway line and Szombathely railway station. Due to the significant expansion of the network, Szombathely railway station became the largest railway station of GYSEV, ahead of Sopron station.

On 6 December 2013, the Stadler FLIRT motor trains on the Sopron-Szombathely-Szentgotthárd railway line were put into service and were operational from 15 December.

In 2014, the railway company contracted 5 Siemens Desiro ML motor trains worth €32 million, which from 4 September 2016 on the Vienna-Sopron-Sopronkeresztúr (Deutschkreutz), Vienna-Pomogy (Pamhagen) section and from December on the Wulkaprodersdorf -Nezsider (Neusiedl) were set into service.

In August 2016, it was announced that GYSEV will buy another 10 FLIRT 3 motor trains for 21.5 billion HUF. The first vehicle has been delivered by the manufacturer in March 2018 and the tenth one by January 2019.

On 14 March 2017, it was announced that the company will purchase 5 dual-powered Vectron AC two-diesel engines and three three-power Vectron MS locomotives and four optional option locomotives for $12.5 billion. The first two vehicles were shipped by the manufacturer in May 2017, followed by the third one in July.

On the 10 of December 2017, rail passenger traffic at the border between Rajka in Hungary and Oroszvár (Rusovce) in Slovakia resumed. The trains are operated by GYSEV between Hegyeshalom - Rajka - Rusovce (Oroszvár)- Bratislava (Pozsony).

Lines 

The company maintains the following railway lines:

 Line 1 Hegyeshalom–Rajka
 Line 8 Győr/Raab–Sopron/Ödenburg–Ebenfurth (Lower Austria), the main line of the company
 Line 9 Neusiedl am See (Burgenland)–Fertőszentmiklós (Hungary), 
 Line 15 Sopron/Ödenburg–Szombathely/Steinamanger (parallel to the Austrian border, in Hungary only; operated by MÁV, the Hungarian State Railway, until 2002)
 Line 16 Porpác–Csorna–Hegyeshalom
 Line 17 Szombathely–Zalaszentiván
 Line 21 Szombathely/Steinamanger–Szentgotthárd/St. Gotthard (as above; operated by MÁV until 2006)
 Line 22 Körmend–Zalalövő (closed, no traffic)
 Széchenyi Museum Railway near Nagycenk/Groß-Zinkendorf (Hungary), a narrow-gauge track constructed in 1972

See also 
 Rail transport in Austria
 Rail transport in Hungary

References

External links 
 
 Official Website of Raaberbahn/GySEV (de, hu, en)

Railway companies of Hungary
Railway companies of Austria
Sopron
Hungarian brands
Railway companies established in 1872
1872 establishments in Austria-Hungary